The Conservative Partnership Institute, also referred to as CPI, is a United States-based conservative nonprofit organization. The stated purpose of CPI is the professional development of conservative staffers and elected officials. Under the leadership of Mark Meadows, the nonprofit has bolstered notable MAGA figures such as U.S. Representatives Marjorie Taylor Greene and Lauren Boebert, according to the Washington Post.

Background
The Conservative Partnership Institute was founded in 2017 by Jim DeMint, who serves as the organization's chairman. Mark Meadows joined as a senior partner in January 2021. The Save America PAC donated $1 million to CPI. A 2022 NPR investigation found CPI might be violating prohibitions on 501(c)(3) charities providing benefits to political parties by supporting candidates and groups aligned with the Republican Party.

Property purchases
Within the span of one year, limited liability companies connected to CPI purchased nine properties that are "steps" from each other other in Washington D.C. Grid News refers to these purchasing entities as "shell companies". The total purchase price for these properties is $41 million. These properties are located two blocks east of the United States Capitol, which houses the U.S. Congress. The purchased properties, which CPI now controls, consist of "four commercial properties along a single Pennsylvania Avenue block, three adjoining rowhouses around the corner, and a garage and carriage house in the rear alley. CPI’s aim, as expressed in its annual report, is to transform the swath of prime real estate into a campus it calls 'Patriot's Row.

The name of Edward Corrigan, the president of CPI, appears on public documents related to the purchases. The companies involved in the purchases list Cameron Seward, CPI’s general counsel and director of operations, as an officer on corporate filings, and give CPI’s Independence Avenue headquarters as their principal address. Seward's name also appears on the purchasing companies' incorporation documents.

References

External links 
 
 YouTube website

Non-profit organizations based in the United States
Conservatism in the United States
Trumpism
Politics of the United States
Political organizations based in the United States
Conservative political advocacy groups in the United States